Dalimil Nejezchleba (born 8 October 1972) is a Czech sports shooter. He competed in the men's 10 metre air rifle event at the 1992 Summer Olympics.

References

1972 births
Living people
Czech male sport shooters
Olympic shooters of Czechoslovakia
Shooters at the 1992 Summer Olympics
Sportspeople from Plzeň